Ulg may refer to:
Ulg, album by Estonian folk metal group Metsatöll. 

ULG is an abbreviation that can also mean: 
University of Liège
IATA code of Ölgii Airport, Mongolia